NMR in Biomedicine is a monthly peer-reviewed medical journal published since 1988 by John Wiley & Sons. It publishes original full-length papers, rapid communications, and review articles in which magnetic resonance spectroscopy or imaging methods are used to investigate physiological, biochemical, biophysical, or medical problems. The current editor-in-chief is John R. Griffiths (Cancer Research UK).

Highest cited articles 
The following articles have been cited most frequently:
 "The basis of anisotropic water diffusion in the nervous system - a technical review", 15 (7-8) Nov-Dec 2002: 435-455, Beaulieu C.
 "A review of chemical issues in H-1-NMR spectroscopy - n-acetyl-l-aspartate, creatine and choline", 4 (2) Apr 1991: 47-52, Miller BL.
 "Fiber tracking: principles and strategies - a technical review", 15 (7-8) Nov-Dec 2002: 468-480, DMori S, van Zijl PCM.
 "Inferring microstructural features and the physiological state of tissues from diffusion-weighted images", 8 (7-8) Nov-Dec 1995: 333-344, Basser PJ.

Abstracting and indexing 
NMR in Biomedicine is abstracted and indexed in:

According to the Journal Citation Reports, the journal has a 2014 impact factor of 3.044, ranking it 9th out of 44 journals in the category "Spectroscopy", 24th out of 125 journals in the category "Radiology Nuclear Medicine & Medical Imaging", and 27th out of 73 journals in the category "Biophysics".

References

External links 

Wiley (publisher) academic journals
Radiology and medical imaging journals
Monthly journals
Publications established in 1988
English-language journals